The Five Colleges and Historic Deerfield Museum Consortium is a consortium of museums in Western Massachusetts and includes art museums which are part of the Five Colleges as well as Historic Deerfield. The Five College Museums maintains a searchable database of the collections of the museums that is among the larger art galleries on the internet.  These museums also participate in Museums10.

Museums included
The Mead Art Museum (Amherst College)
The Mount Holyoke College Art Museum (Mount Holyoke College)
The University Museum of Contemporary Art of the University of Massachusetts Amherst
The Smith College Museum of Art (Smith College)
The Hampshire College Art Gallery (Hampshire College)
Historic Deerfield

See also
Museums10- A consortium of art, science, and history museums in Western Massachusetts

References

External links
Official website

Mount Holyoke College
Smith College
Amherst College
Hampshire College
University of Massachusetts Amherst
Museum organizations
Art in Massachusetts